Pentti Niinivuori (27 August 1931 – 5 July 1988) was a Finnish boxer. He competed at the 1952 Summer Olympics and the 1956 Summer Olympics. At the 1952 Summer Olympics, he lost to Sergio Caprari of Italy.

References

External links
 

1931 births
1988 deaths
Finnish male boxers
Olympic boxers of Finland
Boxers at the 1952 Summer Olympics
Boxers at the 1956 Summer Olympics
People from Forssa
Featherweight boxers
Sportspeople from Kanta-Häme